Viewpoint is a Philippine public affairs television show broadcast by GMA Network. Hosted by Dong Puno, it premiered on August 21, 1984. The show concluded in November 1994.

Accolades

References

1984 Philippine television series debuts 
1994 Philippine television series endings
English-language television shows
GMA Network original programming
GMA Integrated News and Public Affairs shows
Philippine television shows